Poiani or Pojani may refer to:
Poggiodomo, an Italian comune whose people are called Poiani or Pojani
Pojan, a town in southeastern Albania whose football club is KF Pojani
Pojan, Fier, a town in southwestern Albania
Eileen Poiani, American mathematician
Orhan Pojani (1846–1913), Albanian nationalist and magazine publisher